The 2010–11 OJHL season is the 17th season of the Ontario Junior Hockey League (OJHL) and the first since the league existed as two separate bodies in 2009–10. The thirty-one teams of the North, South, East and West Divisions will play 50-game schedules.

Come February, the top teams of each division will play down for the Frank L. Buckland Trophy, the OJHL championship.  The winner of the Buckland Cup will compete in the Central Canadian Junior "A" championship, the Dudley Hewitt Cup.  If successful against the winners of the Northern Ontario Junior Hockey League and Superior International Junior Hockey League, the champion would then move on to play in the Canadian Junior Hockey League championship, the 2011 Royal Bank Cup.

Changes 
OJHL is reformed.
Ajax Attack are gone, they merged into the Pickering Panthers.
Bowmanville Eagles are gone, they merged into the Cobourg Cougars.
Bramalea Blues, Couchiching Terriers, Seguin Bruins fold.
Collingwood Blues change name to Collingwood Blackhawks.
Orangeville Crushers change name to Orangeville Flyers.

Current Standings 
Note: GP = Games played; W = Wins; L = Losses; OTL = Overtime losses; SL = Shootout losses; GF = Goals for; GA = Goals against; PTS = Points; x = clinched playoff berth; y = clinched division title; z = clinched conference title

Please note: Blue is for teams in the Top 3 of their Division and in line to earn a bye from the Qualifier Round.  Green is for teams ranked 7th through 10th in their respective conference, who will be competing in the Qualifier Round

Teams listed on the official league website.

Standings listed by Pointstreak on official league website.

2010-11 Frank L. Buckland Trophy Playoffs

Breakdown:Top 3 in each Division make Conference Quarter-final, 7th through 10th in each conference must compete in best-of-3 Qualifier to make Conference Quarter-final.  In the league semi-final, instead of a Conference Championship, they are doing a crossover round.

Playoff results are listed by Pointstreak on the official league website.

Dudley Hewitt Cup Championship
Hosted by the Huntsville Otters in Huntsville, Ontario.  The Wellington Dukes finished in first place, the Huntsville Otters finished in second place.

Round Robin
Wellington Dukes 7 - Wisconsin Wilderness (SIJHL) 2
Huntsville Otters 6 - Soo Eagles (NOJHL) 4
Wellington Dukes 7 - Soo Eagles (NOJHL) 1
Huntsville Otters 4 - Wisconsin Wilderness (SIJHL) 3
Huntsville Otters 3 - Wellington Dukes 2 in double overtime
Semi-final
Wellington Dukes 3 - Soo Eagles (NOJHL) 2 in quadruple overtime
Final
Wellington Dukes 5 - Huntsville Otters 3

2011 Royal Bank Cup Championship
Hosted by the Camrose Kodiaks in Camrose, Alberta. The Wellington Dukes finished the round robin in fourth and were eliminated in the semi-final.

Round Robin
Camrose Kodiaks (AJHL) 3 - Wellington Dukes 2
Pembroke Lumber Kings (CCHL) 5 - Wellington Dukes 2
Vernon Vipers (BCHL) 5 - Wellington Dukes 2
Wellington Dukes 6 - Portage Terriers (MJHL) 3

Semi-final
Vernon Vipers (BCHL) 4 - Wellington Dukes 1

Scoring leaders 
Note: GP = Games played; G = Goals; A = Assists; Pts = Points; PIM = Penalty minutes

Leading goaltenders 
Note: GP = Games played; Mins = Minutes played; W = Wins; L = Losses: OTL = Overtime losses; SL = Shootout losses; GA = Goals Allowed; SO = Shutouts; GAA = Goals against average

Award winners
Top Scorer - Phil Brewer (Burlington Cougars)
Best Defenceman - Anthony Mastrodicasa (Vaughan Vipers)
Most Gentlemanly Player - Zach Hyman (Hamilton Red Wings)
Most Improved Player - Matt Neal (Stouffville Spirit)
Most Valuable Player - Ryan Demelo (North York Rangers)
Rookie of the Year - Robert Polesello (Vaughan Vipers)
Coach of the Year - Brian Perrin (Newmarket Hurricanes)
Best Goaltender - Charlie Finn (Kingston Voyageurs)

Players selected in 2011 NHL Entry Draft
Rd 3 #78   Brennan Serville -    Winnipeg Jets        (Stouffville Spirit)
Rd 7 #209   Scott Wilson -       Pittsburgh Penguins  (Georgetown Raiders)

See also 
 2011 Royal Bank Cup
 Dudley Hewitt Cup
 List of OJHL seasons
 Northern Ontario Junior Hockey League
 Superior International Junior Hockey League
 Greater Ontario Junior Hockey League
 2010 in ice hockey
 2011 in ice hockey

References

External links 
 Official website of the Ontario Junior Hockey League
 Official website of the Canadian Junior Hockey League

Ontario Junior Hockey League seasons
OJHL